Acanthophyllum is a genus of flowering plants in the family Caryophyllaceae with about 75 species,  spread in the Irano-Turanian area.

Description
Small, shrubby perennial plants with spiny leaves. Flowers white or pink, sessile in solitary or globose heads. Spiny bracts. Calyx cylindrical, with 5 teeth. Petals 5, entire or retuse. Stamens 20. Capsule ovoid, irregularly dehiscent from base. Reniform seeds.

Taxonomy
The genus was described by Carl Anton von Meyer and published in Verzeichness der Pflanzen des Caspischen Meeres 210, 1831. The type species is Acanthophyllum mucronatum C.A.Mey.

Species
, Plants of the World Online accepted the following species:

Acanthophyllum acerosum 
Acanthophyllum aculeatum 
Acanthophyllum adenophorum 
Acanthophyllum afghanicum 
Acanthophyllum albidum 
Acanthophyllum allochrusoides 
Acanthophyllum andarabicum 
Acanthophyllum andersenii 
Acanthophyllum anisocladum 
Acanthophyllum aphananthum 
Acanthophyllum bilobum 
Acanthophyllum bracteatum 
Acanthophyllum brevibracteatum 
Acanthophyllum bungei 
Acanthophyllum caespitosum 
Acanthophyllum cerastioides 
Acanthophyllum coloratum 
Acanthophyllum crassifolium 
Acanthophyllum cyrtostegium 
Acanthophyllum diaphanopterum 
Acanthophyllum diezianum 
Acanthophyllum eglandulosum 
Acanthophyllum ejtehadii 
Acanthophyllum ekbergii 
Acanthophyllum elatius 
Acanthophyllum flavum 
Acanthophyllum glandulosum 
Acanthophyllum gracile 
Acanthophyllum grandiflorum 
Acanthophyllum gypsophiloides 
Acanthophyllum herniarioides 
Acanthophyllum honigbergeri 
Acanthophyllum kabulicum 
Acanthophyllum kandaharicum 
Acanthophyllum kermanense 
Acanthophyllum knorringianum 
Acanthophyllum korolkowii 
Acanthophyllum korshinskyi 
Acanthophyllum krascheninnikovii 
Acanthophyllum lamondiae 
Acanthophyllum laxiflorum 
Acanthophyllum laxiusculum 
Acanthophyllum lilacinum 
Acanthophyllum lindbergii 
Acanthophyllum longicalyx 
Acanthophyllum luteum 
Acanthophyllum maimanense 
Acanthophyllum makranicum 
Acanthophyllum mikeschinianum 
Acanthophyllum mucronatum 
Acanthophyllum myrianthum 
Acanthophyllum oppositiflorum 
Acanthophyllum pachycephalum 
Acanthophyllum pachystegium 
Acanthophyllum paniculatum 
Acanthophyllum persicum 
Acanthophyllum pleiostegium 
Acanthophyllum popovii 
Acanthophyllum pulcherrimum 
Acanthophyllum pulchrum 
Acanthophyllum pungens 
Acanthophyllum raphiophyllum 
Acanthophyllum recurvum 
Acanthophyllum sarawschanicum 
Acanthophyllum scapiflorum 
Acanthophyllum schugnanicum 
Acanthophyllum sedifolium 
Acanthophyllum sordidum 
Acanthophyllum speciosum 
Acanthophyllum spinosum 
Acanthophyllum squarrosum 
Acanthophyllum stenocalycinum 
Acanthophyllum stenostegium 
Acanthophyllum stocksianum 
Acanthophyllum subglabrum 
Acanthophyllum tadshikistanicum 
Acanthophyllum takhtajanii 
Acanthophyllum transhyrcanum 
Acanthophyllum versicolor 
Acanthophyllum verticillatum 
Acanthophyllum xanthoporphyranthum 
Acanthophyllum yasamin-nassehiae

References

Bibliography
 Bailey, L.H. & E.Z. Bailey. 1976. Hortus Third i–xiv, 1–1290. MacMillan, New York.
 Nasir, E. & S. I. Ali (eds). 1980–2005. Fl. Pakistan Univ. of Karachi, Karachi.

Caryophyllaceae
Caryophyllaceae genera